Leif Steinar Rolland (born 13 December 1970) is a Norwegian sport shooter. He was born in Bergen. He competed at the 1996, 2000 and 2004 Summer Olympics. He made World Record in the 10m Air Rifle category first in the 1997 Munich World Cup and then at the 2001 World Cup in Seoul. He is the former coach of the Norway (Junior, Senior & Para) shooting team. He is the coach of Indian air rifle shooter Pushan Jain.

References

External links

1970 births
Living people
Sportspeople from Bergen
Norwegian male sport shooters
Olympic shooters of Norway
Shooters at the 1996 Summer Olympics
Shooters at the 2000 Summer Olympics
Shooters at the 2004 Summer Olympics
20th-century Norwegian people
21st-century Norwegian people